Park Won-Hong  (born April 7, 1984) is a South Korean football player.

Club career 

Park joined Ulsan Hyundai in 2006.  In 2008, he moved to Gwangju Sangmu, the military's football club, to fulfill his military obligations.  On 12 September 2010, late in the second half of a match against Incheon United, he scored his first professional goal ensuring a 1 - 1 draw.  Following the completion of his military service, Park briefly returned to Ulsan Hyundai but then moved offshore to Indonesia to continue his professional football career.

References

External links

1984 births
Living people
South Korean footballers
Expatriate footballers in Indonesia
Ulsan Hyundai FC players
Gimcheon Sangmu FC players
K League 1 players
Korea National League players
Sportspeople from Ulsan
Association football midfielders